IMS Law College is a law school located in Noida, Uttar Pradesh, India. The college is affiliated to Chaudhary Charan Singh University and recognized by Bar Council of India. It was established in 2004.

Rankings
 
IMS Law College was ranked 16 among private law colleges in India by Outlook India in 2022.

References

External links

Law schools in Uttar Pradesh
Universities and colleges in Noida
Educational institutions established in 2004
2004 establishments in Uttar Pradesh